The Vendée Globe is a single-handed (solo) non-stop round the world yacht race. The race was founded by Philippe Jeantot in 1989, and since 1992 has taken place every four years. It is named after the Département of Vendée, in France, where the race starts and ends. The Vendée Globe is considered an extreme quest of individual endurance and the ultimate test in ocean racing.

The race

History 
The race was founded as "The Globe Challenge" in 1989 by French yachtsman Philippe Jeantot. Jeantot had competed in the BOC Challenge in 1982–83 and 1986–87, winning the 60-foot class ("Class I") both time. The BOC Challenge was sailed in stages with sailors being given the chance to rest and repair their boats at ports around the world.Unsatisfied with the race's format, he decided to set up a new round-the-world non-stop race, which he felt would be the ultimate challenge for single-handed sailors.

The first race was run in 1989–90, and was won by Titouan Lamazou; Jeantot himself took part, and placed fourth. The next race was in 1992–93; and it has since then been run every four years. The inaugural race included 11 Frenchmen, one South African (Bertie Reed) and one American (Mike Plant).

Yachts 

The race is open to monohull yachts conforming to the Open 60 class criteria. Prior to 2004, the race was also open to Open 50 boats. The Open classes are unrestricted in certain aspects, but a box rule governs parameters such as overall length, draught, appendages and stability, as well as numerous other safety features.

The race presents significant challenges; most notably the severe wind and wave conditions in the Southern Ocean, the long unassisted duration of the race, and the fact that the course takes competitors far from the reach of any normal emergency response. A significant proportion of the entrants usually retire, and in the 1996–97 race Canadian Gerry Roufs was lost at sea.

Course
 
The race starts and finishes in Les Sables-d'Olonne, in the Département of Vendée, in France; both Les Sables d’Olonne and the Vendée Conseil Général are official race sponsors. The course is essentially a circumnavigation along the clipper route: from Les Sables d’Olonne, down the Atlantic Ocean to the Cape of Good Hope; then clockwise around Antarctica, keeping Cape Leeuwin and Cape Horn to port; then back to Les Sables d’Olonne.

Additional waypoints may be set in the sailing instructions for a particular race, in order to ensure safety relative to ice conditions, weather, etc.

The competitors may stop at anchor, but may not draw alongside a quay or another vessel; they may receive no outside assistance, including customised weather or routing information. The only exception is that a competitor who has an early problem may return to the start for repairs and then restart the race, as long the restart is within 10 days of the official start.

Qualification

To mitigate the risks, competitors are required to undergo medical and survival courses. They must also be able to demonstrate prior racing experience; either a completed single-handed trans-oceanic race or the completion of a previous Vendée Globe.

Race Editions

1st Edition: 1989–1990

2nd Edition: 1992–1993

3rd Edition: 1996–1997

4th Edition: 2000–2001

5th Edition: 2004–2005

6th Edition: 2008–2009

7th Edition: 2012–2013

8th Edition: 2016–2017

9th Edition: 2020–2021

10th Edition: 2024–2025

Results

Overall winners

Overall winners' times

Farthest distance covered in 24 hours

Winners' participation and equipment

Starters, finishers and nationalities 

Note * Some sailors' dates of birth unknown

See also 

IMOCA races
 The Barcelona World Race , a non-stop two handed race, currently run using the IMOCA 60 Class.
Route du Rhum
 The Velux 5 Oceans Race , a stopping solo race, currently run using the IMOCA 60 Class previously known as the BOC Challenge, later as Around Alone.
 The Ocean Race, a stopping fully crewed race, currently using the Volvo Ocean 65 and IMOCA 60 class. Previously known as the Whitbread Round The World Race and the Volvo Ocean Race.

Other races
 The Clipper Round the World Yacht Race , a stopping crewed race for amateur crews using the Clipper 70 Class.
 Jules Verne Trophy
 Oryx Quest

Former races including
 The Sunday Times Golden Globe Race, held in 1968–1969, the first round-the-world yacht race.
 The BT Global Challenge, was a race held every four years and followed the westward route.
 The Race, was a race held in 2000, involving multihulls.
 The Oryx Quest, held in 2005, starting from Qatar.

Other speed sailing records
 Speed sailing record
 World Sailing Speed Record Council
 Transatlantic sailing record

 Circumnavigation
 List of circumnavigations

References

External links 

 
Recurring sporting events established in 1989